An African reference alphabet was first proposed in 1978 by a UNESCO-organized conference held in Niamey, Niger, and the proposed alphabet was revised in 1982. The conference recommended the use of single letters for a sound (that is, a phoneme) instead of using two or three-letter combinations, or letters with diacritical marks.

The African Reference Alphabet is clearly related to the Africa Alphabet and reflected practice based on the latter (including use of IPA characters). The Niamey conference also built on work of a previous UNESCO-organized meeting on harmonization of transcriptions of African languages, that was held in Bamako, Mali, in 1966.

1978 version
Separate versions of the conference's report were produced in English and French. Different images of the alphabet were used in the two versions, and there are a number of differences between the two.

The English version proposed an alphabet of 57 letters, given in both upper and lower-case forms. Eight of these are formed from common Latin letters with the addition of an underline mark (_).

This version also listed eight accents (acute accent (´), grave accent (`), circumflex (ˆ), caron (ˇ), macron (¯), tilde (˜), trema  (¨), and a superscript dot (˙) and nine punctuation marks (? ! « » , ; .).

In the French version, the letters were hand-printed in lower case only. Only 56 of the letters in the English version were listed – omitting the hooktop-z – and two further apostrophe-like letters (ʾ and ʿ) were included for [ʔ and ʕ]. Also, five of the letters were written with a subscript dot instead of an underscore as in the English version (ḍ ḥ ṣ ṭ and ẓ). (These represent Arabic-style emphatic consonants while the remaining underlined letters (c̱, q̱ and x̱) represent clicks.) Accents and punctuation do not appear. The French and English sets are otherwise identical.

Notes:

 Ɑ/ɑ is "Latin alpha" not "Latin script a".
 The upper case I, the counterpart of the lower case i, does not have crossbars while the upper case counterpart of the lower case ɪ has them.
 The letter “Z with tophook” is not included in Unicode.
c̱, q̱, x̱ represent click consonants (ǀ, ǃ, ǁ respectively), but the line under is optional, and usually not used.
c, j represent either palatal stops or postalveolar affricates. ɖ, ʈ are the retroflex stops, as in the IPA.
ƒ, ʋ represent bilabial fricatives.
Although digraphs using h are normally used to represent aspirated consonants, in languages in which those are absent, the digraphs can be used instead of ʒ, ʃ, θ, ɣ...
Digraphs with m or n are used for prenasalized consonants, with w and y for labialized and palatalized consonants; kp and gb are used for labial-velar stops; hl and dl are used for lateral fricatives.
ɓ, ɗ are used for implosives, and ƭ, ƙ for either ejectives or voiceless implosives. ƴ is used for [ʔʲ].
Nasalization is either written with a nasal consonant following the vowel, or with a tilde. Tone is indicated using the acute accent, grave accent, caron, macron, and circumflex. Diaeresis is used for centralized vowels, and vowel length is indicated by doubling the vowel.
Segmentation should be done according to each language's own phonology and morphology.

1982 version
The 1982 revision of the alphabet was made by Michael Mann and David Dalby, who had attended the Niamey conference. It has 60 letters; some are quite different from the 1978 version. Another key feature of this alphabet is that it included only lower-case letters, making it unicase.

A typewriter keyboard was proposed as well: for the additional characters, the uppercase letters had to be given up. It was probably for this reason that the keyboard did not get used.

The 32nd letter “” is called linearized tilde. This character is not included in Unicode (as of version 14, September 2021), but can be represented by ɴ (U+0274 ).

See also
Africa Alphabet
Dinka alphabet
ISO 6438
Pan-Nigerian alphabet
Standard Alphabet by Lepsius

References

Further reading
Mann, Michael, and David Dalby. 1987. A thesaurus of African languages: A classified and annotated inventory of the spoken languages of Africa with an appendix on their written representation. London: Hans Zell Publishers.

External links
African Languages: Proceedings of the meeting of experts on the transcription and harmonization of African languages, Niamey (Niger), 17–21 July 1978, Paris: UNESCO, 1981
http://scripts.sil.org/cms/scripts/page.php?site_id=nrsi&item_id=IntlNiameyKybd
http://www.bisharat.net/Documents/Niamey78annex.htm

Latin alphabets
Writing systems of Africa
Latin-script letters
Writing systems introduced in 1978
Phonetic alphabets